Spanilá jízda (Beautiful Ride or The Nuremberg Campaign) is a 1963 Czechoslovak historical film, directed by Oldřich Daněk. The film is set in 1427-1430.

Cast
 Petr Kostka as Ondřej Keřský z Řimovi
 Jiří Vala as Eschweiler z Hohenbachu
 Michaela Lohniská as Katruše
 Jaroslav Průcha as Mikeš
 Martin Růžek as Prokop the Great
 Jiří Holý as Priest Jíra
 Karel Höger as Henry Beaufort
 Vlasta Fialová as Elisabeth of Hohenzollern
 Václav Špidla as Friedrich von Hohenzollern

Plot
The film starts in 1427. Hussite army faces Crusaders at Tachov. Crusdaders are led by Henry Beaufort and hussites by Prokop the Great. One of crusaders loyal to Henry Beaufort is Eschweiler z Hohenbachu. Eschweiler murdered family of Ondřej Keřský and kidnapped his bride Anka. Ondřej joins hussite army so he can get revenge on Eschweiler but is caught when he tries to steal a horse and is whipped. When both armies face each other  Crusaders run away from hussites. Three years later Ondřej is an experienced soldier. He sees opportunity to get revenge and joins campaign to Bavaria. City by city surrenders to hussites. Ondřej tries to find Eschweieler but nobody knows him. Hussites are getting closer to Nuremberg. Friedrich von Hohenzollern tries to negotiate with hussites. He promises to let 15 hussites enter Nuremberg. Ondřej is one of them. He finally finds Eschweiler. He finds out that Eschweiler raped Anka and she died when she gave birth to a son. He shows Ondřej her grave where he attacks him but Ondřej kills him. Hussite army is surrounded by army that Friedrich von Hohenzollern sent against them. Hussites never reached Nuremberg.

References

External links
 

1963 films
Czechoslovak black-and-white films
1960s Czech-language films
Czech historical films
Films set in the Middle Ages
Films about Hussite Wars
František Vláčil
Prokop the Great